Mazenod College may refer to:

 Mazenod College, Victoria, a Roman Catholic high school in Mulgrave, Victoria
 Mazenod College, Western Australia, a Roman Catholic high school in Lesmurdie, Western Australia